In modular arithmetic, Thue's lemma roughly states that every modular integer may be represented by a "modular fraction" such that the numerator and the denominator have absolute values not greater than the square root of the modulus.

and 

The first known proof is attributed to  who used a pigeonhole argument. It can be used to prove Fermat's theorem on sums of two squares by taking m to be a prime p that is congruent to 1 modulo 4 and taking a to satisfy a2 + 1 = 0 mod p.  (Such an "a" is guaranteed for "p" by Wilson's theorem.)

Uniqueness

In general, the solution whose existence is asserted by Thue's lemma is not unique.
.

More precisely, with above notation, if 
 
and 
,
with 

and 

then

This result is the basis for rational reconstruction, which allows using modular arithmetic for computing rational numbers for which one knows bounds for numerators and denominators.

The proof is rather easy: by multiplying each congruence by the other  and subtracting, one gets

This implies that , hence the result.

Computing solutions
The original proof of Thue's lemma is not efficient, in the sense that it does not provide any fast method for computing the solution.  
The extended Euclidean algorithm, allows us to provide a proof that leads to an efficient algorithm that has the same computational complexity of the Euclidean algorithm.

More precisely, given the two integers  and  appearing in Thue's lemma, the extended Euclidean algorithm computes three sequences of integers ,   and  such that

The desired solution is, up to the sign, the first pair  such that .

See also
 Padé approximant, a similar theory, for approximating Taylor series by rational functions

References
  

Lemmas in number theory
Modular arithmetic